Keith Beavers (born February 9, 1983) is a backstroke and medley swimmer from Canada who represented his native country at the 2004 Summer Olympics in Athens, Greece. In 2006, at the Pan Pacific Trials, he lowered his 200-metre backstroke record to 1:58.97.

He was born in London, Ontario, and grew up in the town of Orangeville, Ontario, attending Mono and Amaranth Public School. He began his swimming career at the age of 6 with the Orangeville Otters Swim Club, where he swam to the age of 8. He then switched to the Dorado Stars Swim Club where he swam for a number of years.

In 2008, Beavers qualified for the 2008 Summer Olympics in Beijing in the 200-metre backstroke and 400-metre individual medley. Beavers was once again representing the Region of Waterloo Swim club under coach Dean Boles.  He placed 7th in the 200-metre individual medley final. Beavers has announced his retirement from international competition. He is now in Kingston coaching KBM (Kingston Blue Marlins).

In 2009 Beavers received his Master of Science in Kinesiology from University of Waterloo followed by his Master of Science in Physical Therapy from Queens University in 2013.  He is a practicing physiotherapist in Kingston, Ontario, Canada.

See also
 List of University of Waterloo people

External links
 Team Canada profile
 Focus Personal Fitness Health Care Professionals

References

1983 births
Living people
Canadian male backstroke swimmers
Canadian male medley swimmers
Olympic swimmers of Canada
People from Orangeville, Ontario
Swimmers at the 2004 Summer Olympics
Swimmers at the 2007 Pan American Games
Swimmers at the 2008 Summer Olympics
Swimmers from London, Ontario
University of Waterloo alumni
Pan American Games bronze medalists for Canada
Pan American Games medalists in swimming
Universiade medalists in swimming
Universiade silver medalists for Canada
Universiade bronze medalists for Canada
Medalists at the 2009 Summer Universiade
Medalists at the 2007 Pan American Games